Palmar arteries may refer to:

 Common palmar digital arteries
 Palmar metacarpal arteries
 Proper palmar digital arteries